Santo Pecado (English: Holy Sin) is the ninth studio album recorded by Guatemalan singer-songwriter Ricardo Arjona. It was released by Sony BMG Latin on November 19, 2002 (see 2002 in music) and was produced by Arjona, Carlos Cabral Jr. and Fernando Otero. The album earned nomination for Latin Grammy Award for Best Male Pop Vocal Album in the 4th Annual Latin Grammy Awards on September 3, 2003, losing by Quizás by Enrique Iglesias.

Reception 
The AllMusic review by Jason Birchmeier awarded the album 3.5 stars stating "Needless to say, Arjona's songwriting is masterful. Even if the musical style of a particular song isn't to one's liking, the lyrics are always a wonder to behold. ".

Track listing 
All tracks by Ricardo Arjona except where noted.

 "El Problema" (The Problem) – 5:31
 "Dame" (Give Me) – 3:46
 "Quesos, Cosas, Casas" (Cheeses, Things, Houses) – 5:06
 "Minutos" (Minutes) (Arjona, Miguel Luna) – 4:08
 "Vivir Sin Ti Es Posible" (Living Without You Is Possible) – 4:31
 "Santo Pecado" (Holy Sin) – 4:29
 "Mujer de Lujo" (Woman of Luxury) – 3:54
 "Señor Juez" (Mr. Judge) – 3:39
 "Se Fué" (She Left) – 4:19
 "La Nena (Bitácora de Un Secuestro)" (The Girl (Chronicle of A Kidnapping)) – 7:54
 "Me Dejaste" (You Left Me) – 4:05
 "No Sirve de Nada" (It's Useless) – 4:27
 "Duele Verte" (Hurt Seeing You) – 4:42
 "Amarte a Ti" (Loving You) – 4:11

Personnel 
Taken from the album's liner notes.

 Ricardo Arjona – vocals, arranger, producer
 Carlos Cabral Junior - co-producer, arranger, guitars, programming , keyboard
 Robert Adcock, Maurice Grants, Daniel Smith – cello
 Patricia Aiken, Mark Baranov, Kristin Fife, Armen Garabedian, Al Hershberger, Tiffiany Yi Hu, Johana Krejci, Dennis Molchan, Frances Moore, Irma Neumann, Julie Rogers, Lisa Sutton, Jacqueline Suzuki, Ericka Syroid, Francine Walsh, North Wood, Shari Zippert – violin
 James Atkinson, Kurt Snyder – French horn
 Kim Bullard – hammond organ
 Vinnie Colaiuta – drums
 Rose Corrigan – fagotes
 Héctor del Curto – bandoneon
 George Doering – autoharp, dulcimer, acoustic guitar, steel guitar, koto, mandoline, ukulele
 Assa Drori, Davis Young – string quartet
 Mike Englander – tympani
 Jerry Epstein – string quartet, viola
 Samuel Formicola, Lynn Grants, John Hayhurst, Renita Koven, Andrew Picken – viola
 Joel Hernández, Elizabeth Meza, David Torrens – backing vocals
 Dan Higgins – clarinet
 Michael Landau – electric guitar
 Armando Montiel, Rafael Padilla – percussion
 Jennifer Munday – string quartet, violin
 Barbara Northcutt – oboe
 Fernando Otero – arranger, conductor, keyboards, mini moog, hammond organ, piano, producer
 Víctor Patron – arranger, keyboards
 David Shostac – flute
 Neil Stubenhaus – bass
 Cecilia Tsan – cello, string quartet
 David Young – double bass

Technical 
 Christina Abaroa – production coordination
 Will Quinnell, Julio Chávez – assistant
 Benny Faccone, Isaías García, Chris Gehringer, Ben Wish – engineer
 Jimmy Hoyson, Steve Robillard, Justin Smith, Sam Story – assistant engineer
 José Antonio Valencia – general coordination
 Ricardo Trabulsi – photography
 Evanna Fernández – product manager

Sales and certifications

References

External links 
Official website

2002 albums
Ricardo Arjona albums
Spanish-language albums
Sony Discos albums